Marko Atanackovic (born 13 May 1986) is a Swedish football goalkeeper who plays for Assyriska FF.

Career

Club career
Brought up in Djurgårdens IF's system, the goalkeeper spent almost an entire career in lower leagues of Sweden. He played over 100 league games each for both Arameisk-Syrianska IF and IK Frej before finally getting a try at playing abroad. Signing for lowly Czech club 1. SC Znojmo FK, the contract was soon annulled due to irregularities with the player agent. 

He played the spring season for another Swedish low-level club before moving to Greece in the summer of 2019. In the Super League Greece 2, he debuted in a fully professional league at the age of 33 for Panachaiki GE. 

As the team imploded, he went home to Sweden again to join third-tier Sollentuna FK. In June 2020, Atanackovic was accused of playing large sums of money on matches he himself had played in. Atanackovic, however, denied the allegations, stating that he did not want to play in a club that came with false accusations against him and for that reason he left the club shortly after his arrival.

References

1986 births
Living people
Footballers from Stockholm
Swedish people of Serbian descent
Swedish footballers
Association football goalkeepers
AFC Eskilstuna players
Djurgårdens IF Fotboll players
Arameisk-Syrianska IF players
Vasalunds IF players
IK Frej players
Panachaiki F.C. players
Sollentuna FK players
Assyriska FF players
Ettan Fotboll players
Superettan players
Super League Greece 2 players
Swedish expatriate footballers
Expatriate footballers in the Czech Republic
Swedish expatriate sportspeople in the Czech Republic
Expatriate footballers in Greece
Swedish expatriate sportspeople in Greece